As long as humans have experienced pain, they have given explanations for its existence and sought soothing agents to dull or cease the painful sensation. Archaeologists have uncovered clay tablets dating back as far as 5,000 BC which reference the cultivation and use of the opium poppy to bring joy and cease pain. In 800 BC, the Greek writer Homer wrote in his epic, The Odyssey, of Telemachus, a man who used opium to soothe his pain and forget his worries.  While some cultures researched analgesics and allowed or encouraged their use, others perceived pain to be a necessary, integral sensation. Physicians of the 19th century used pain as a diagnostic tool, theorizing that a greater amount of personally perceived pain was correlated to a greater internal vitality, and as a treatment in and of itself, inflicting pain on their patients to rid the patient of evil and unbalanced humors.  This article focuses both on the history of how pain has been perceived across time and culture, but also how malleable an individual's perception of pain can be due to factors like situation, their visual perception of the pain, and previous history with pain.

Historical theories

Early theories 

Because of the only relatively recent discovery of neurons and how they conduct and interpret signals, including sensations such as pain, within the body, various theories have been proposed as to the causes of pain and its role or function. Even within seemingly limited groups, such as the ancient Greeks, there were competing theories as to the root cause of pain. Aristotle did not include a sense of pain when he enumerated the five senses; he, like Plato before him, saw pain and pleasure not as sensations but as emotions ("passions of the soul"). Alternatively, Hippocrates believed that pain was caused by an imbalance in the vital fluids of a human. At this time, Aristotle did not believe that the brain had any role to play in pain processing, but rather implicated the heart as the central organ for the sensation of pain. He was the principal advocate of the cardio-centric theory of the soul, and differed in this from the encephalo-centric proposals of, among others, Hippocrate, who explicitly considered that the brain was the source of "our pains, grief, anxieties and tears" (Hippocrates, in: W.H.S. Jones (Ed.), The Sacred Disease, vol. 2, The Loeb Classical Library, Cambridge, 1923). The dichotomy between encephalocentrists and  cardiocentrists extended well into Renaissance, the Aristotelic cardio-centric vision being the one that prevailed among philosophers, although disputed by eminent doctors such as Galen (Crivellato E, Ribatti D. Soul, mind, brain: Greek philosophy and the birth of neuroscience. Brain Research Bulletin 71 (2007) 327–336).

Middle ages and Early Modern Period 

In the 11th century, Avicenna theorized that there were a number of feeling senses including touch, pain and titillation.

In a religious context, pain could be seen as a punishment or a trial from God. But this religious conception did not prevent Early Modern Physicians from being concerned by the problem of pain: they tried to cure it with pain-killers called "anodynes" ; they discussed the problem of the phantom-pain, described in the 16th century by the surgeon Ambroise Paré; and they proposed rich descriptions of the signs of pain.

In his Treatise of Man (published posth., 1664), René Descartes theorized that the body was more similar to a machine, and that pain was a disturbance that passed down along nerve fibers until the disturbance reached the brain. This theory transformed the perception of pain from a spiritual experience to a physical, mechanical sensation meaning that a cure for such pain could be found by researching and locating pain fibers within the bodies.

Specificity theory 

The specificity theory, which states that pain is "a specific sensation, with its own sensory apparatus independent of touch and other senses," emerged in the nineteenth century, but had been prefigured by the work of Avicenna and Descartes.

Scottish anatomist Charles Bell proposed in 1811 that there exist different kinds of sensory receptor, each adapted to respond to only one stimulus type. In 1839 Johannes Müller, having established that a single stimulus type (e.g., a blow, electric current) can produce different sensations depending on the type of nerve stimulated, hypothesized that there is a specific energy, peculiar to each of five nerve types that serve Aristotle's five senses, and that it is the type of energy that determines the type of sensation each nerve produces. He considered feelings such as itching, pleasure, pain, heat, cold and touch to be varieties of the single sense he called "feeling and touch." Müller's doctrine killed off the ancient idea that nerves carry actual properties or incorporeal copies of the perceived object, marking the beginning of the modern era of sensory psychology, and prompted others to ask, do the nerves that evoke the different qualities of touch and feeling have specific characteristics?

Filippo Pacini had isolated receptors in the nervous system which detect pressure and vibrations in 1831. Georg Meissner and Rudolf Wagner described receptors sensitive to light touch in 1852; and Wilhelm Krause found a receptor that responds to gentle vibration in 1860. Moritz Schiff was first to definitively formulate the specificity theory of pain when, in 1858, he demonstrated that touch and pain sensations traveled to the brain along separate spinal cord pathways. In 1882 Magnus Blix reported that specific spots on the skin elicit sensations of either cold or heat when stimulated, and proposed that "the different sensations of cool and warm are caused by stimulation of different, specific receptors in the skin." Max von Frey found and described these heat and cold receptors and, in 1896, reported finding "pain spots" on the skin of human subjects. Von Frey proposed there are low threshold cutaneous spots that elicit the feeling of touch, and high threshold spots that elicit pain, and that pain is a distinct cutaneous sensation, independent of touch, heat and cold, and associated with free nerve endings.

Intensive theory 

In the first volume of his 1794 Zoonomia; or the Laws of Organic Life, Erasmus Darwin supported the idea advanced in Plato's Timaeus, that pain is not a unique sensory modality, but an emotional state produced by stronger than normal stimuli such as intense light, pressure or temperature. Wilhelm Erb, in 1874, also argued that pain can be generated by any sensory stimulus, provided it is intense enough, and his formulation of the hypothesis became known as the intensive theory.

Alfred Goldscheider (1884) confirmed the existence of distinct heat and cold sensors, by evoking heat and cold sensations using a fine needle to penetrate to and electrically stimulate different nerve trunks, bypassing their receptors. Though he failed to find specific pain sensitive spots on the skin, Goldscheider concluded in 1895 that the available evidence supported pain specificity, and held the view until a series of experiments were conducted in 1889 by Bernhard Naunyn. Naunyn had rapidly (60–600 times/second) prodded the skin of tabes dorsalis patients, below their touch threshold (e.g., with a hair), and in 6–20 seconds produced unbearable pain. He obtained similar results using other stimuli including electricity to produce rapid, sub-threshold stimulation, and concluded pain is the product of summation. In 1894 Goldscheider extended the intensive theory, proposing that each tactile nerve fiber can evoke three distinct qualities of sensation – tickle, touch and pain – the quality depending on the intensity of stimulation; and extended Naunyn's summation idea, proposing that, over time, activity from peripheral fibers may accumulate in the dorsal horn of the spinal cord, and "spill over" from the peripheral fiber to a pain-signalling spinal cord fiber once a threshold of activity has been crossed. The British psychologist, Edward Titchener, pronounced in his 1896 textbook, "excessive stimulation of any sense organ or direct injury to any sensory nerve occasions the common sensation of pain."

Competing theories 

By the mid-1890s, specificity was mainly backed by physiologists (prominently by von Frey) and clinicians; and the intensive theory received most support from psychologists. But after Henry Head in England published a series of clinical observations between 1893 and 1896, and von Frey's experiments between 1894 and 1897, the psychologists migrated to specificity almost en masse, and by century's end, most textbooks on physiology and psychology were presenting pain specificity as fact, with Titchener in 1898 now placing "the sensation of pain" alongside that of pressure, heat and cold. Though the intensive theory no longer featured prominently in textbooks, Goldscheider's elaboration of it nevertheless stood its ground in opposition to von Frey's specificity at the frontiers of research, and was supported by some influential theorists well into the mid-twentieth century.

William Kenneth Livingston advanced a summation theory in 1943, proposing that high intensity signals, arriving at the spinal cord from damage to nerve or tissue, set up a reverberating, self-exciting loop of activity in a pool of interneurons, and once a threshold of activity is crossed, these interneurons then activate "transmission" cells which carry the signal to the brain's pain mechanism; that the reverberating interneuron activity also spreads to other spinal cord cells that trigger a sympathetic nervous system and somatic motor system response; and these responses, as well as fear and other emotions elicited by pain, feed into and perpetuate the reverberating interneuron activity. A similar proposal was made by RW Gerard in 1951, who proposed also that intense peripheral nerve signalling may cause temporary failure of inhibition in spinal cord neurons, allowing them to fire as synchronized pools, with signal volleys strong enough to activate the pain mechanism.

Pattern theory 

Building on John Paul Nafe's 1934 suggestion that different cutaneous qualities are the product of different temporal and spatial patterns of stimulation, and ignoring a large body of strong evidence for receptor fiber specificity, DC Sinclair and G Weddell's 1955 "peripheral pattern theory" proposed that all skin fiber endings (with the exception of those innervating hair cells) are identical, and that pain is produced by intense stimulation of these fibers. In 1953, Willem Noordenbos had observed that a signal carried from the area of injury along large diameter "touch, pressure or vibration" fibers may inhibit the signal carried by the thinner "pain" fibers — the ratio of large fiber signal to thin fiber signal determining pain intensity; hence, we rub a smack. This was taken as a demonstration that pattern of stimulation (of large and thin fibers in this instance) modulates pain intensity.

Gate control theory 

Ronald Melzack and Patrick Wall introduced their "gate control" theory of pain in the 1965 Science article "Pain Mechanisms: A New Theory". The authors proposed that both thin (pain) and large diameter (touch, pressure, vibration) nerve fibers carry information from the site of injury to two destinations in the dorsal horn of the spinal cord: transmission cells that carry the pain signal up to the brain, and inhibitory interneurons that impede transmission cell activity. Activity in both thin and large diameter fibers excites transmission cells. Thin fiber activity impedes the inhibitory cells (tending to allow the transmission cell to fire) and large diameter fiber activity excites the inhibitory cells (tending to inhibit transmission cell activity). So, the more large fiber (touch, pressure, vibration) activity relative to thin fiber activity at the inhibitory cell, the less pain is felt. The authors had drawn a neural "circuit diagram" to explain why we rub a smack. They pictured not only a signal traveling from the site of injury to the inhibitory and transmission cells and up the spinal cord to the brain, but also a signal traveling from the site of injury directly up the cord to the brain (bypassing the inhibitory and transmission cells) where, depending on the state of the brain, it may trigger a signal back down the spinal cord to modulate inhibitory cell activity (and so pain intensity). The theory offered a physiological explanation for the previously observed effect of psychology on pain perception.

Modern theories

A biopsychosocial phenomenon 

In 1975, the International Association for the Study of Pain sought a consensus definition for pain, finalizing "an unpleasant sensory and emotional experience associated with actual or potential tissue damage, or described in terms of such damage" as the final definition. It is clear from this definition that while it is understood that pain is a physical phenomenon, the emotional state of a person, as well as the context or situation associated with the pain also impacts the perception of the nociceptive or noxious event.

Modern research has gathered considerable amounts of evidence that support the theory that pain is not only a physical phenomenon but rather a biopsychosocial phenomenon, encompassing culture, nociceptive stimuli, and the environment in the experience and perception of pain. For example, the Sun Dance is a ritual performed by traditional groups of Native Americans. In this ritual, cuts are made into the chest of a young man. Strips of leather are slipped through the cuts, and poles are tied to the leather. This ritual lasts for hours and undoubtedly generates large amounts of nociceptive signaling, however the pain may not be perceived as noxious or even perceived at all. The ritual is designed around overcoming and transcending the effects of pain, where pain is either welcomed or simply not perceived.

Visual input and pain perception 

Additional research has shown that the experience of pain is shaped by a plethora of contextual factors, including vision. Researchers have found that when a subject views the area of their body that is being stimulated, the subject will report a lowered amount of perceived pain. For example, one research study used a heat stimulation on their subjects' hands. When the subject was directed to look at their hand when the painful heat stimulus was applied, the subject experienced an analgesic effect and reported a higher temperature pain threshold. Additionally, when the view of their hand was increased, the analgesic effect also increased and vice versa. This research demonstrated how the perception of pain relies on visual input.

The use of fMRI to study brain activity confirms the link between visual perception and pain perception. It has been found that the brain regions that convey the perception of pain are the same regions that encode the size of visual inputs. One specific area, the magnitude-related insula of the insular cortex, functions to perceive the size of a visual stimulation and integrate the concept of that size across various sensory systems, including the perception of pain. This area also overlaps with the nociceptive-specific insula, part of the insula that selectively processes nociception, leading to the conclusion that there is an interaction and interface between the two areas. This interaction tells the individual how much relative pain they are experiencing, leading to the subjective perception of pain based on the current visual stimulus.

Humans have always sought to understand why they experience pain and how that pain comes about. While pain was previously thought to be the work of evil spirits, it is now understood to be a neurological signal. However, the perception of pain is not absolute and can be impacted by various factors in including the context surrounding the painful stimulus, the visual perception of the stimulus, and an individual's personal history with pain.

See also 
 Neuromatrix

Notes 

Pain